Juan Ernesto Simón (born 2 March 1960) is an Argentine former footballer who played as a defender.

Career

Early years

Born in Rosario, Santa Fe Province, Simón started his career with Newell's Old Boys in 1977, at age 9. In 1979, he was part of the Argentina national under-20 football team that won the FIFA U-20 World Cup. He received his first call up to the full Argentina team in 1980.

France

Simón moved to France in 1983 to play for Monaco, in 1986 he joined Strasbourg where he played until 1988.

Return to Argentina

In 1988 Simón returned to Argentina joining Boca Juniors, he won several titles with the club including their first official league title for eleven years in 1992. He was a key part of their defence during the late 80's and early 90s. In 1990, he was part of the Argentina squad that reached the World Cup final. He retired in 1994.

Honours

External links
 Racing Strasbourg player profile
 
 “Para ser un gran jugador tenés que tener suerte y estar en el lugar indicado”, Semanario Colón Doce, 2008

1960 births
Living people
Footballers from Rosario, Santa Fe
Newell's Old Boys footballers
AS Monaco FC players
RC Strasbourg Alsace players
Boca Juniors footballers
Association football defenders
Argentine footballers
1990 FIFA World Cup players
Argentina youth international footballers
Argentina under-20 international footballers
Argentina international footballers
Argentine Primera División players
Ligue 1 players
Argentine expatriate footballers
Expatriate footballers in Monaco
Expatriate footballers in France
Argentine expatriate sportspeople in France
Argentine expatriate sportspeople in Monaco